"The Wink" is the 114th episode of NBC sitcom Seinfeld. This was the fourth episode in the seventh season. It first aired on October 12, 1995. In this episode, George's compulsive winking after grapefruit is squirted into his eye is subject to a variety of misinterpretations, Elaine dates her wake-up service caller and feuds with her cousin Holly over their grandmother's old possessions, and Jerry tries to conceal his healthy eating habits from Holly while dating her.

Plot
Jerry has become health-conscious; at Monk's Café, he orders a veggie sandwich and a grapefruit for breakfast. The grapefruit is accidentally squirted into George's eye, causing him to wink involuntarily. Mr. Wilhelm inquires of a coworker, Mr. Morgan, who has been late several times recently. George assures him that Morgan is not causing any trouble, but Wilhelm interprets his winking as insinuating that the opposite is true. George recommends a wake-up service to Morgan so he will be on-time for work.

Jerry dates Elaine's cousin, Holly, who invites him to a steakhouse for lunch. To stay healthy, Jerry orders just a salad, to which Holly reacts with disdain; Elaine points this out to him later and he feels upset at himself. Elaine starts dating her wake-up service caller, James, but his two dogs dislike her. She and Jerry are invited to Holly's house for dinner, where she serves mutton. Jerry sees this as an opportunity to improve his relationship, so he acts excited about the meat, but spits it out into the cloth napkins and hides them in his jacket. Elaine borrows the jacket and gets chased by dogs who smell the mutton. She takes refuge at James' apartment. Since there is only one bed, she and James sleep "head-to-toe". She constantly kicks James in her sleep, so he oversleeps and neglects to call his customers, among them Morgan, who is late to work again. Holly discovers her napkins are missing, and assumes Elaine stole them out of spite.

Kramer finds a birthday card that George is preparing for Mr. Steinbrenner. Since all the New York Yankees are signing the card, Kramer asks George if he can sell it to a sports memorabilia store. George refuses, but his wink is misinterpreted again, and Kramer sells the card. He later asks Kramer for the card, but the store has already sold it to someone whose son is hospitalized; he also angrily explains to Kramer that he wasn't winking and demands he get the card back. Kramer visits the boy, named Bobby, who promises to return the card if Kramer gets Yankee Paul O'Neill to hit two home runs in the following game. O'Neill hits a home run in the first inning. In the eighth inning, he hits an inside-the-park home run, but the hit is ruled a triple due to a fielding error. Kramer convinces Bobby to give up the card by promising O'Neill will catch a ball in his hat the next day.

Wilhelm proposes firing Morgan and recommending George for his position, much to George's dismay, as Morgan's job involves a great deal of work but at the same pay. Kramer returns the card to George, but since it was framed under glass by Bobby's father, Morgan cannot sign it.

Elaine leaves Jerry's jacket at James' apartment. His dogs rip it up to find the mutton in the pockets. James returns the jacket while Holly is at Jerry's, so she discovers that he was hiding both the mutton and the napkins, which James turned into bandanas for his dogs. Holly presumably breaks up with Jerry for lying to her about eating the mutton and for being so health-conscious. Steinbrenner congratulates George for his work on the birthday card and is insulted at Morgan's not having signed it. George tries to talk him out of firing Morgan, but his efforts are useless and he receives the promotion.

Production
The scene with Paul O'Neill was the first scene filmed for Seinfelds seventh season, to take advantage of the New York Yankees being in the area for a game.

References

External links
 

Seinfeld (season 7) episodes
1995 American television episodes